Balsley is a surname. Notable people with the surname include:

 Darren Balsley, pitching coach at Major League Baseball's San Diego Padres franchise
 John H. Balsley, master carpenter and inventor
 Phil Balsley, the former baritone singer for the retired country vocal group The Statler Brothers
 Thomas Balsley, American landscape architect

See also
 Balsley Peak, a distinctive peak in Alexandra Mountains
 Balslev (disambiguation)